Palladium black is a coarse, sponge-like form of elemental palladium which offers a large surface area for catalytic activity. It is used in organic synthesis as a catalyst for hydrogenation reactions.

The term palladium black is also used colloquially to refer to a black precipitate of elemental palladium, which forms via decomposition of various palladium complexes.

Preparation
Palladium black is typically prepared from palladium(II) chloride or palladium(II)-ammonium chloride. The palladium chloride process entails the formation of palladium hydroxide using lithium hydroxide followed by reduction under hydrogen gas while the palladium(II)-ammonium chloride route employs a solution of formic acid followed by the precipitation of the catalyst using potassium hydroxide.

See also
Platinum black
Platinum dioxide
Platinum on carbon
Palladium on carbon
Rhodium-platinum oxide

References

Palladium
Hydrogenation catalysts